The LVI Legislature of the Congress of Mexico met from 1994 to 1997.

Members of the LVI Legislature

 Dip. Aburto Torres Taide
 Dip. Acebo Salman Jesús Guillermo
 Dip. Aceves del Olmo Carlos Humberto
 Dip. Aceves Hernández Pablo Pedro
 Dip. Acosta Ruelas Miguel
 Dip. Aguiar Ortega Gabriel
 Dip. Aguilar Martínez José Luis
 Dip. Aguilar Zinser Adolfo Miguel
 Dip. Aguirre Corral Leobardo
 Dip. Aispuro Torres José Rosas
 Dip. Alarcón Bárcena Gonzalo
 Dip. Alavez Mendoza Baruc Efraín
 Dip. Alba Padilla Audomaro
 Dip. Alvarado Castañón Marta
 Dip. Alvarado García Antelmo
 Dip. Alvarez Ayala Roldán
 Dip. Alvarez Bernal María Elena
 Dip. Alvarez Cuevas Guillermo Héctor
 Dip. Alvárez Salgado Roberto
 Dip. Alvarez Trasviña Víctor Manuel
 Dip. Amaya Medina Alfredo
 Dip. Amaya Téllez Rodimiro
 Dip. Anaya Gutiérrez Alberto
 Dip. Andrade Quezada Humberto
 Dip. Arce Islas René
 Dip. Arceo Castro Jaime Jesús
 Dip. Arciniega Portillo Manuel
 Dip. Arellano Aguilar Gerardo de Jesús
 Dip. Arellano López Osbelia
 Dip. Arias Aparicio Eduardo
 Dip. Arreola Arreola José Roberto
 Dip. Audry Sánchez Alejandro Iván
 Dip. Avila Rodríguez Gaspar
 Dip. Avila Zúñiga Salvador Othón
 Dip. Ayala López Rafael
 Dip. Baeza González Manuel
 Dip. Balleza Sánchez Josefina Silvia
 Dip. Ballinas Mayes Armando Octavio
 Dip. Baños Baños Tomás
 Dip. Bautista López Héctor Miguel
 Dip. Becerra Rodríguez Salvador
 Dip. Beltrán del Río Madrid Salvador
 Dip. Benítez Gálvez Edgar Román
 Dip. Beristain Gómez Manuel
 Dip. Bernal Arenas Olga
 Dip. Betanzos Moreno María Virginia
 Dip. Blanco Casco Ma.de los Angeles Marina
 Dip. Bolaños Bolaños Francisco Andrés
 Dip. Botello Treviño Consuelo
 Dip. Botey Estape Carlota Angela Rosa
 Dip. Bravo Padilla Izcóatl Tonatiuh
 Dip. Burgos Ochoa Leticia
 Dip. Cabrera Lotfe Rosa María
 Dip. Calderón y Cecilio Carlos Rubén
 Dip. Calvillo Ramos Ramiro Javier
 Dip. Calzada Gómez Ma. Leticia
 Dip. Camacho Garibo Desiderio
 Dip. Camero Gómez Leticia
 Dip. Campa Cifrián Roberto Rafael
 Dip. Cancino Herrera Alí
 Dip. Cantón Zetina Oscar
 Dip. Carbajal Cárdenas Ramona
 Dip. Cárdenas Gudiño Ramón
 Dip. Cárdenas Lebrija Eduardo Amador
 Dip. Cárdenas Monroy Oscar Gustavo
 Dip. Carrillo Zavala Abelardo
 Dip. Casillas Ontiveros Ofelia
 Dip. Castañeda Pérez José Alberto
 Dip. Castaño Contreras Cristian
 Dip. Castelazo y de los Angeles José R.
 Dip. Castellanos Hernández Raúl Gonzalo
 Dip. Castillo Cabrera Jorge de Jesús
 Dip. Castillo Flores Ignacio
 Dip. Castro López Florentino
 Dip. Catalán Sosa Jorge Antonio
 Dip. Catalán Valdez Florencio
 Dip. Ceballos Cancino Rafael
 Dip. Cedillo y Amador Irma Eugenia
 Dip. Cejudo Díaz Jorge Adolfo
 Dip. Cepeda de León Ana Lilia
 Dip. Cerón Nequiz Irene Maricela
 Dip. Céspedes Arcos Alicia
 Dip. Chable Gutiérrez Manuel de Atocha
 Dip. Chávez Castillo César Antonio
 Dip. Chávez Zavala Lorenzo
 Dip. Cisneros Fernández Joaquín
 Dip. Coello Herrera Claudio Manuel
 Dip. Contreras Flores Ignacio
 Dip. Contreras Salazar Luis Alberto
 Dip. Coronel Zenteno Manuel Alberto
 Dip. Cortés Vences Jorge
 Dip. Cortez Cervantes María Teresa
 Dip. Cota Montaño Leonel Efraín
 Dip. Covarrubias Ramos Daniel
 Dip. Cruz Acevedo Juan Manuel
 Dip. Cruz Malpica Amado Jesús
 Dip. Cruz Martínez Marcos Carlos
 Dip. Cruz Merino Fernando
 Dip. Cruz Ramírez Víctor
 Dip. Cuauhtémoc Paleta José Ignacio
 Dip. Cueva Aguirre Arnulfo
 Dip. Dávila Juárez Jorge Enrique
 Dip. Dávila Montesinos Marco Antonio
 Dip. De la Fuente Lazo Carlos Mario
 Dip. De la Torre Hernández Mario
 Dip. De la Vega García Netzahualcóyotl
 Dip. De León Contreras Eustaquio
 Dip. De los Cobos Silva José Gerardo
 Dip. Decanini Livas Dante
 Dip. Del Angel Amador Genaro Alfonso
 Dip. Del Río Navarro Jaime Mariano
 Dip. Delgado Guerra Erasmo
 Dip. Díaz Chávez Rafael
 Dip. Díaz Salazar María Cristina
 Dip. Díaz Suárez Servando Andrés
 Dip. Díaz y Pérez Duarte Alejandro
 Dip. Domínguez García Francisco
 Dip. Domínguez Rivero Leonel
 Dip. Duarte Zapata Lorenzo
 Dip. Durán Ruíz José Jesús
 Dip. Elizondo Torres Rodolfo
 Dip. Equihua Equihua Martín
 Dip. Escalante Castillo Gabriel
 Dip. Escobar Toledo Saúl Alfonso
 Dip. Escobedo Miramontes José Eduardo
 Dip. Espino Barrientos Manuel de Jesús
 Dip. Espinosa Mejía Ezequiel Juan de Dios
 Dip. Esqueda Llanes Ma. Claudia
 Dip. Esquinca Gurrusquieta Jesús
 Dip. Esteva Melchor Luis Andrés
 Dip. Etienne Llano Pedro René
 Dip. Everardo Medrano
 Dip. Fernández Gavaldón Matías Salvador
 Dip. Fernández Rivera Régulo Pastor
 Dip. Fernández Serna Gabino
 Dip. Figueroa Montes Blas Fortino
 Dip. Flores Espinosa Felipe Amadeo
 Dip. Flores Gómez González Fernando Jesús
 Dip. Flores González Gerardo Roberto
 Dip. Flores González Roberto Modesto
 Dip. Flores Méndez José Luis
 Dip. Flores Olvera Pedro
 Dip. Flores Rodríguez Adolfo Ramón
 Dip. Flores Rodríguez Ezequiel
 Dip. Flores Valdez Anastacia Guadalupe
 Dip. Flores Vizcarra Carlos
 Dip. Fuentes Alcocer Manuel Jesús
 Dip. Gaber Arjona Tuffy
 Dip. Galindo Quiñones Heriberto Manuel
 Dip. Galván Rivas Andrés
 Dip. Gamboa Enríquez Armando
 Dip. García Castañeda Julio Felipe
 Dip. García Cervantes Ricardo Francisco
 Dip. García Cruz Anselmo
 Dip. García García José Manuel
 Dip. García García Miguel Angel
 Dip. García Peraza José Feliciano
 Dip. García Ramírez Abel
 Dip. García Sáenz Eliezar
 Dip. García Villa Juan Antonio
 Dip. Garduño Morales Patricia
 Dip. Garfías Magaña Luis
 Dip. Garzacabello García Fernando
 Dip. Garzón Franco María Elisa
 Dip. Garzón Santibáñez Alfonso
 Dip. Godina Herrera Ricardo Luis Antonio
 Dip. Godoy Rangel Leonel
 Dip. Gómez García Jorge Humberto
 Dip. Gómez Hernández Vito Lucas
 Dip. Gómez Mont y Urueta María Teresa
 Dip. Gómez Pasillas Jacinto
 Dip. Gómez Uranga Manlio Fabio
 Dip. Gómez Vega Guillermo Alejandro
 Dip. Gómez Villanueva Augusto
 Dip. González Achem José Luis Fernando
 Dip. González Aguilera José Luis
 Dip. González Alba Sabino
 Dip. González Alcocer Alejandro
 Dip. González Cerecedo Alicia
 Dip. González Garza Javier
 Dip. González González Jorge
 Dip. González Hernández Yolanda Eugenia
 Dip. González Herrera Saúl
 Dip. González Luna Mendoza José Mauro
 Dip. González Macías Rodolfo
 Dip. González Magallón César Humberto
 Dip. González Mocken Héctor Armando
 Dip. González Paras José Natividad
 Dip. González Quiroga César
 Dip. González Rebolledo Ignacio
 Dip. González Reyes Héctor
 Dip. González y Guardado Guillermo
 Dip. González Yáñez Oscar
 Dip. Guerra Díaz María del Rosario
 Dip. Guerra Ochoa Juan Nicasio
 Dip. Guizar Macías Francisco Javier
 Dip. Gutiérrez Bravo Horacio Alejandro
 Dip. Gutiérrez Gutiérrez Alejandro
 Dip. Gutiérrez Hernández Prisciliano Diego
 Dip. Gutiérrez Robles Javier de Jesús
 Dip. Gutiérrez Vidal Javier Alberto
 Dip. Hernández Armenta Francisco Javier
 Dip. Hernández Balderas Florencio Martín
 Dip. Hernández Castillo Rolando
 Dip. Hernández Cruz Antonio
 Dip. Hernández Deras Ismael Alfredo
 Dip. Hernández Domínguez Jorge
 Dip. Hernández Fraguas José Antonio
 Dip. Hernández Hernández Virginia
 Dip. Hernández Labastida Ramón Miguel
 Dip. Hernández Martínez Jesús Carlos
 Dip. Hernández Reyes Antonio
 Dip. Hernández Ríos María Cecilia
 Dip. Hernández Vázquez Lázaro
 Dip. Hernández Vélez Jesús Salvador
 Dip. Hidalgo y García B. Matilde del Mar
 Dip. Higuera Osuna Alejandro
 Dip. Hinojosa Juárez Manuel
 Dip. Ibarra de la Garza María del Rosario
 Dip. Iñiguez Cervantes José
 Dip. Islas Chío Miguel Angel
 Dip. Islas Hernández Adrián Víctor Hugo
 Dip. Jacobo García Rafael
 Dip. Jiménez Gómez Germán
 Dip. Jiménez Leal Saúlo Rubén
 Dip. Jiménez Lemus Luis Manuel
 Dip. Jordán Arzate Agustín Mauro
 Dip. Juárez Cisneros René
 Dip. Juárez del Angel Joaquín
 Dip. Juárez Santiago Pascual
 Dip. Kondo López Jorge
 Dip. Krauss Velarde Franciscana
 Dip. Lara Chanes Raúl
 Dip. Leal Angulo Augusto César
 Dip. Ledezma Durán Francisco
 Dip. Ledezma Magaña Israel Reyes
 Dip. Leñero Alvarez Mónica Gabriela
 Dip. León Montoya Walter Antonio
 Dip. Lepe Bautista Cecilio
 Dip. Lerdo de Tejada Covarrubias Sebastián
 Dip. Levin Coppel Oscar Guillermo
 Dip. Leyson Castro José Luis
 Dip. Leyva Acevedo Efrén Nicolás
 Dip. Leyva Mendívil Juan
 Dip. Licona Spínola Ana María Adelina
 Dip. Lima Malvido María de la Luz
 Dip. Limón Tapia José Francisco
 Dip. Linares González Nohelia
 Dip. Livas Vera Raúl Alejandro
 Dip. Lizárraga Zatarain Heriberto Tomáz
 Dip. Llado Castillo Zaida Alicia
 Dip. Llamas Monjardín Gustavo Gabriel
 Dip. Longoria Hernández Martín Gerardo
 Dip. López Barraza Héctor Humberto
 Dip. López Cárdenas Fructuoso
 Dip. López Orduña Salvador
 Dip. López Sánchez Jorge Abel
 Dip. López y Macías Pedro Guadalupe
 Dip. Lozada Chávez José Francisco
 Dip. Lucero Palma Lorenzo Miguel
 Dip. Luján Peña Guillermo Alberto
 Dip. Luna Parra y Trejo Lerdo Adriana Ma.
 Dip. Luque Feregrino Ernesto de Jesús
 Dip. Macías Beilis Giuseppe
 Dip. Maldonado Ruíz Francisco
 Dip. Manzo Godínez Miguel Humberto
 Dip. Marcué y Pardiñas Manuel
 Dip. Marín Huazo Aurelio
 Dip. Márquez Cabrera María Rosa
 Dip. Martínez Alvarez José Luis
 Dip. Martínez Della Rocca Salvador Pablo
 Dip. Martínez Guerra Alfonso
 Dip. Martínez Hernández Ifigenia Martha
 Dip. Martínez López José de la Cruz
 Dip. Martínez Maldonado Agustín
 Dip. Martínez Rivera Francisco
 Dip. Martínez Sánchez Everardo
 Dip. Martínez Tapia Jaime
 Dip. Martínez Torres José Antonio
 Dip. Martínez Veloz Jaime Cleofas
 Dip. Martínez Verdugo Arnoldo
 Dip. Mata Bracamontes José Luis
 Dip. Meade Ocaranza Jorge Armando
 Dip. Medina Ojeda Antonio
 Dip. Meléndez Franco Jesús Manuel
 Dip. Mena Salas Luis Felipe
 Dip. Méndez Márquez Victoria Eugenia
 Dip. Méndez Meneses Apolonio
 Dip. Mendoza Peña Martha Patricia
 Dip. Menéndez Haces Ricardo
 Dip. Meneses Carrasco Hugo
 Dip. Merlín Castro Gladys
 Dip. Meza Galván Humberto
 Dip. Meza López Sergio Teodoro
 Dip. Michel Díaz Marco Antonio
 Dip. Mikel Rivera Salvador
 Dip. Miranda Añorve Marcelino
 Dip. Molina Martínez Néstor
 Dip. Molina Ruibal Alfonso
 Dip. Montaño Arteaga Martín Aureliano
 Dip. Montenegro Espinoza Martina
 Dip. Montenegro Villa Liberato
 Dip. Morales Ledesma María Guadalupe
 Dip. Moreno Berry Alejandro
 Dip. Moreno Carbajal José Noé Mario
 Dip. Moreno Collado Jorge Efraín
 Dip. Moreno Cota Pablo
 Dip. Moreno Muñoz Eusebio
 Dip. Moyao Morales Eliseo
 Dip. Muñoz Covarrubias Emma
 Dip. Muñoz Rivera Wilfrido Isidro
 Dip. Muza Simón Sara Esther
 Dip. Narro Céspedes José
 Dip. Nava Bolaños Gerardo Gabriel
 Dip. Navarrete Montes de Oca Ricardo T.
 Dip. Navarrete Ruíz Carlos
 Dip. Nieto Guzmán Jorge Ricardo
 Dip. Noguera Corona Virgilia
 Dip. Norzagaray Norzagaray Lauro
 Dip. Noyola Bernal Jesús Eduardo
 Dip. Núñez Hurtado Carlos
 Dip. Núñez Pellegrín Rafael
 Dip. Núñez Ramos Serafín
 Dip. Nuño Luna Carlos Alfonso
 Dip. Ocejo Moreno Jorge Andrés
 Dip. Ochoa Samayoa Hildiberto
 Dip. Ojeda Zubieta César Raúl
 Dip. Olivares Ventura Héctor Hugo
 Dip. Olivera Orozco Ma. Remedios
 Dip. Olvera Méndez Jesús
 Dip. Ordaz Moreno Gerardo
 Dip. Orihuela Carmona Fernando
 Dip. Orozco Loreto Ismael
 Dip. Ortega Espinoza Javier
 Dip. Ortega Martínez J. Jesús
 Dip. Ortiz Jonguitud Miguel
 Dip. Ortiz Walls Eugenio
 Dip. Osorio Palacios Juan José
 Dip. Ovalle Fernández Ignacio
 Dip. Pacheco Arjona Manuel Jesús
 Dip. Pacheco Martínez Fernando
 Dip. Pacheco Rodríguez Ricardo Fidel
 Dip. Padilla Martín Ricardo
 Dip. Padilla Olvera Jorge Humberto
 Dip. Padilla Padilla José de Jesús
 Dip. Palacios Sosa Víctor Manuel
 Dip. Palma César Victor Samuel
 Dip. Parra Gómez Marcos Efrén
 Dip. Patiño Cardona Francisco
 Dip. Patiño Terán José Enrique
 Dip. Pedraza Martínez Roberto
 Dip. Peniche Bolio Francisco José
 Dip. Peralta Burelo Francisco
 Dip. Pérez Bonilla Manuel
 Dip. Pérez Corona Juan Manuel
 Dip. Pérez Cuéllar Cruz
 Dip. Pérez Fernández Francisco Curi
 Dip. Pérez García Fidel
 Dip. Pérez Hernández Antonio
 Dip. Pérez Jácome Dionisio Eduardo
 Dip. Pérez Noriega Fernando
 Dip. Pérez Rico Carlos
 Dip. Pérez Vázquez Severiano
 Dip. Pérez Verduzco Cándido
 Dip. Pereznegrón Pereznegrón Horacio
 Dip. Pineda Valdez J. Fidel
 Dip. Pineda y Serino Javier
 Dip. Piza Soberanis Antonio
 Dip. Ponce de León Coluby Carlos Servando
 Dip. Preciado Bermejo José de Jesús
 Dip. Priego Ortíz Luis
 Dip. Prieto Gamboa Sergio Emigdio
 Dip. Quintana Silveyra Victor Manuel
 Dip. Quintero Martínez Raúl Armando
 Dip. Quintero Peña Daniel
 Dip. Quiroz Durán Primo
 Dip. Quiroz Preza José Arturo
 Dip. Ramírez Chávez Raúl
 Dip. Ramírez Córdova Pascual
 Dip. Ramírez Gamero José
 Dip. Ramírez Garrido Abreu Graco Luis
 Dip. Ramírez Ortega María del Socorro
 Dip. Ramírez Pérez Filemón
 Dip. Ramírez Ramírez Marcelo
 Dip. Ramírez Vargas Sergio Inocencio
 Dip. Ramos Damián José Santos
 Dip. Ramos Dávila Yrene
 Dip. Ramos Rodríguez Enrique
 Dip. Rascón Córdoba Marco Antonio Ignacio
 Dip. Rendón Castrejón Lauro
 Dip. Reta Martínez Carlos Alfonso
 Dip. Reyes Medrano Alfonso
 Dip. Reyes Retana Márquez Regina
 Dip. Ricardez Vela Ma. del Carmen
 Dip. Rico Samaniego Luis Alberto
 Dip. Ríos Magaña Raúl
 Dip. Ríos Vázquez Alfonso Primitivo
 Dip. Rivadeneira y Rivas Fernando Jesús
 Dip. Rivera Barrón Antonio
 Dip. Rivera Díaz Calixto Javier
 Dip. Rivera Pavón Pedro Guillermo
 Dip. Rivera Torres Primo
 Dip. Robledo Silva Rodrigo
 Dip. Robles Berlanga María del Rosario
 Dip. Robles Garnica Roberto
 Dip. Robles Villaseñor Mara Nadiezhda
 Dip. Rodríguez López Jaime
 Dip. Rodríguez Lugo Joaquín
 Dip. Rodríguez Martínez Hugo Fernando
 Dip. Rodríguez Ramírez Miguel
 Dip. Rodríguez Rivera Gerardo Macario
 Dip. Rodríguez y Rodríguez Jesús
 Dip. Rojas Cruz Graciela
 Dip. Rojas Díaz Durán Alejandro
 Dip. Rojo Gutiérrez Jesús Ramón
 Dip. Romero Castillo Ma. Guadalupe Cecilia
 Dip. Romero Montaño Enrique
 Dip. Romero Oropeza Octavio
 Dip. Romero Tobón Fidencio
 Dip. Roque Villanueva Humberto
 Dip. Rosales Anaya Mario Alejandro
 Dip. Ruán Ruiz Luis
 Dip. Rubín Cruz Tito
 Dip. Rubio Barthell Eric Luis
 Dip. Rubio y Ragazzoni Víctor Manuel
 Dip. Russek Valles Manuel Enrique
 Dip. Ruvalcaba León Jesús Rafael
 Dip. Salazar Pérez Luz de Jesús
 Dip. Salcedo Solís José Luis
 Dip. Saldaña Pérez María Lucero
 Dip. Salgado Brito Juan
 Dip. Salgado Delgado Fernando
 Dip. Salido Almada Crisóforo Lauro
 Dip. Salinas Iñiguez Gustavo
 Dip. Salinas Ortíz Aurelio
 Dip. San Román Arreaga Héctor
 Dip. Sánchez Aguilar Luis
 Dip. Sánchez Anaya Alfonso Abraham
 Dip. Sánchez Ascencio José Pedro
 Dip. Sánchez Gochicoa Antonio
 Dip. Sánchez Hernández Gloria
 Dip. Sánchez Juárez José
 Dip. Sánchez Ochoa José de Jesús
 Dip. Sánchez Ramírez Edgar
 Dip. Sandoval Ramírez Cuauhtémoc
 Dip. Santana Rubio Heriberto
 Dip. Santos Covarrubias Francisco Javier
 Dip. Sauri Riancho Dulce María
 Dip. Segura Dorantes Miguel Alberto
 Dip. Segura Rangel María del Carmen
 Dip. Siller Rojas Jesús
 Dip. Silva Tejeda Víctor Manuel
 Dip. Solórzano Fraga José Alfonso
 Dip. Solórzano Solís Emiio
 Dip. Sosamontes Herrera Moro Ramón
 Dip. Soto Correa J. Carmen
 Dip. Suárez Dávila Francisco
 Dip. Tallabs Ortega Jesús Antonio
 Dip. Tejeda Martínez Max
 Dip. Tenorio Adame Francisco Antonio
 Dip. Thomsen D'Abbadie Kurt Antonio
 Dip. Torreblanca Galindo Carlos Zeferino
 Dip. Torres Aguilar Alejandro
 Dip. Torres Delgado Agustín
 Dip. Torres Ortega José Luis
 Dip. Tovar Estrada Juan Manuel
 Dip. Trejo González Abel
 Dip. Trélles Iruretagoyena Daniel Ernesto
 Dip. Urdapilleta Núñez Jorge
 Dip. Uribe Caldera Julieta
 Dip. Urióstegui Miranda Píndaro
 Dip. Valdés Mondragón Josué
 Dip. Valdez Gaxiola Alfredo
 Dip. Valencia Abundis Sofía
 Dip. Vargas Garza Carlota Guadalupe
 Dip. Vargas Santos David
 Dip. Vázquez Hernández Mario Enrique
 Dip. Vázquez Olivas Sergio
 Dip. Vela González Joaquín Humberto
 Dip. Velasco Velasco Abel Eloy
 Dip. Velázquez Hernández Froylán
 Dip. Verteramo Pérez Carlos José
 Dip. Villalobos Chávez Oscar
 Dip. Villanueva Mukul Eric Eber
 Dip. Villaseñor Tatay Alejandro
 Dip. Viniegra Zubiria Javier
 Dip. Viornery Mendoza Mario Alberto
 Dip. Wade González Jorge
 Dip. Xochihua Valdez Zenén
 Dip. Xochihua Valdez Zenén
 Dip. Zambrano Grijalva José de Jesús
 Dip. Zamora Barradas Rogelio
 Dip. Zamorano Ayala Homar
 Dip. Zapata Perogordo José Alejandro
 Dip. Zarrazaga Molina Lidia Isabel M.
 Dip. Zavala Medel Ma. del Carmen
 Dip. Zúñiga Martínez Guillermo Héctor

Sources
Mexican Chamber of Deputies

Congress of Mexico by session